EPSD or ePSD may refer to: 

Española Public School District #55, a school district based in Española, New Mexico, USA
The electronic Pennsylvania Sumerian Dictionary, an online dictionary of the Sumerian language